Theta Apodis (θ Apodis, θ Aps) is a variable star in the southern circumpolar constellation of Apus. It is a variable star with an apparent visual magnitude range of 4.65 to 6.20, which, according to the Bortle Dark-Sky Scale, means it is a faint star but visible to the naked eye from dark suburban skies. It is unusual in that it is a red star with a high proper motion (greater than 50 milliarcseconds a year).

This is an evolved red giant that is currently on the asymptotic giant branch, with a stellar classification of M7 III. It is a semiregular pulsating variable and its brightness changes over a range of 0.56 magnitudes with a period of 119 days. A longer period of around 1,000 days has also been detected. It is losing mass at the rate of  times the mass of the Sun per year through its stellar wind. Dusty material ejected from this star is interacting with the surrounding interstellar medium, forming a bow shock as the star moves through the galaxy.

Theta Apodis has been identified as an astrometric binary, indicating that it has an orbiting companion that causes gravitational perturbation of the primary star.

References

122250
Apodis, Theta
Apus (constellation)
M-type giants
Semiregular variable stars
068815
Asymptotic-giant-branch stars
5261
Durchmusterung objects
Astrometric binaries